Warijun is an administrative unit, known as Union Council, of Chitral District in the Khyber Pakhtunkhwa province of Pakistan. The district of Chitral is divided into three tehsils and 24 Union Councils.

References

Chitral District
Tehsils of Chitral District
Union councils of Khyber Pakhtunkhwa
Populated places in Chitral District
Union councils of Chitral District